Laura Tovar Pérez (born November 10, 1996, in Colombia) is a Colombian professional squash player. She has represented her country.

References

External links 
 

1996 births
Living people
Colombian female squash players
Pan American Games medalists in squash
Pan American Games bronze medalists for Colombia
Squash players at the 2015 Pan American Games
Squash players at the 2019 Pan American Games
South American Games gold medalists for Colombia
South American Games silver medalists for Colombia
South American Games medalists in squash
Competitors at the 2018 South American Games
Competitors at the 2013 World Games
Medalists at the 2015 Pan American Games
Medalists at the 2019 Pan American Games
21st-century Colombian women
Competitors at the 2022 World Games